The men's doubles tournament at the 1983 French Open was held from 23 May until 5 June 1983 on the outdoor clay courts at the Stade Roland Garros in Paris, France. Anders Järryd and Hans Simonsson won the title, defeating Mark Edmondson and Sherwood Stewart in the final.

Seeds

Draw

Finals

Top half

Section 1

Section 2

Bottom half

Section 3

Section 4

External links
 Association of Tennis Professionals (ATP) – main draw
1983 French Open – Men's draws and results at the International Tennis Federation

Men's Doubles
French Open by year – Men's doubles